Class 2700 may refer to:

Bangladesh Railway Class 2700
IE 2700 and 2750 Classes operated by Iarnród Éireann